Radula visianica is a species of liverwort in the Radulaceae family. It is European Alps endemic. It was thought to be extinct since 1938 but was rediscovered in 2014 in Austria.

References

Porellales
Flora of Europe
Taxonomy articles created by Polbot